William Culham Woodward, also known as Billy Woodward and Willy Woodward, (April 24, 1885 – February 24, 1957) was a member of a successful merchandising family in Vancouver, British Columbia, Canada.  Heir to the Woodward's department store chain founded by his father Charles A. Woodward in 1891, he started out in 1907 as a bookkeeper for the store, ultimately rising to become company president in 1937 upon his father's death.  He was succeeded in that capacity by his son, Charles N. "Chunky" Woodward in 1956.

Among the many other positions Woodward held were Charter Member of the Board of the Bank of Canada from its founding in March, 1935; President of the Vancouver Board of Trade; Life Governor of the Vancouver General Hospital; Founder and Patron of the Vancouver Little Theatre.  During World War I, he served overseas in the First Canadian Heavy Artillery.   Woodward was, like his father, a member of the Grand Lodge of British Columbia and Yukon of the International Order of Freemasonry.

Woodward served as the 16th Lieutenant Governor of British Columbia from 1941 to 1946.

References

1885 births
1957 deaths
Lieutenant Governors of British Columbia
Canadian Freemasons
Canadian military personnel of World War I
Canadian military personnel from Ontario
Royal Regiment of Canadian Artillery personnel